The Napier Gazelle is a turboshaft helicopter engine that was  manufactured by D. Napier & Son in the mid-1950s. In 1961 production was nominally transferred to a joint venture with Rolls-Royce called Napier Aero Engines Limited. But the venture closed two years later.

Variants
NGa.1Emergency rating  at 20,400 rpm, 1 hour rating  at 19,800 rpm, Max continuous rating  at 19,000 rpm
NGa.2Emergency rating  at 20,400 rpm
NGa.2(R)
NGa.2 series 2
NGa.3Emergency rating  at 20,400 rpm
NGa.4Emergency rating  at 20,400 rpm
NGa.13(R)
NGa.13 series 2
NGa.18
NGa.22
Mk.101
Mk.161
Mk.162 (NGa.13 series 2)
Mk.165
Gazelle 501
Gazelle 503
Gazelle 512
Gazelle 514
Gazelle E.219

Applications
These helicopter engines were used on the Westland Wessex HAS 1 and HAS 3 (other versions of the Wessex had two Rolls-Royce Gnome engines) and the Bristol Belvedere (later Westland Belvedere) transport helicopter.

Engines on display

A preserved Napier Gazelle is on display at the Royal Air Force Museum London.
A preserved Napier Gazelle from a Westland Wessex helicopter is on display at the Queensland Air Museum, Caloundra, Australia.
A Napier Gazelle is on display at the South Yorkshire Aircraft Museum, Doncaster
A further Napier Gazelle is displayed at the Solent Sky Museum, Southampton

Specifications (Gazelle 501 / Mk.101 / NGa.2(R))

See also

References

Notes

Bibliography

 Gunston, Bill. World Encyclopedia of Aero Engines. Cambridge, England. Patrick Stephens Limited, 1989.

External links

Flight, July 1967, Napier Gazelle

Gazelle
1950s turboshaft engines